Adrián "Adri" López Garrote (born 9 January 1999) is a Spanish professional footballer who plays as a goalkeeper for Granada CF.

Club career
Born in Barcelona, Catalonia, López joined RCD Espanyol's youth setup in 2007, from UD Vista Alegre. He made his senior debut with the reserves on 30 September 2018, starting in a 2–0 Segunda División B home win over SD Ejea.

A backup to Edu Frías in his first senior season, López became a regular starter in his second, after Frías left for Córdoba CF. On 5 September 2020, he was loaned to fellow third tier side Hércules CF, for one year.

López terminated his contract with the Pericos on 22 July 2021, and signed a permanent one-year deal with Hércules two days later. On 6 July 2022, he agreed to a contract with Granada CF, being assigned to the reserves in Segunda Federación.

López made his first team debut for the Nazaríes on 13 November 2022, playing the full 90 minutes in a 3–2 away success over Yeclano Deportivo, for the season's Copa del Rey. His professional debut occurred 14 days later, as he replaced field player Jorge Molina in a 1–0 Segunda División away loss against CD Leganés, after starter Raúl Fernández was sent off.

References

External links

1999 births
Living people
Footballers from Barcelona
Spanish footballers
Association football goalkeepers
Segunda División players
Segunda División B players
Segunda Federación players
RCD Espanyol B footballers
Hércules CF players
Club Recreativo Granada players
Granada CF footballers
Spain youth international footballers